Macroramphosus, snipefishes or bellowfishes, is a genus of fishes found in tropical and subtropical oceans at depths down to . According to FishBase, they are part of the family Centriscidae, but Nelson (2016) split that family, in which case the genus Macroramphosus is in the family Macroramphosidae. They have long second spines on their dorsal fins and tiny mouths at the tip of their greatly elongated snouts. The bodies of snipefish are more streamlined than in the related bellowfishes. They are sometimes found in large schools. This is the only genus on the monogeneric family Macroranphosidae but some authorities include the genera Centriscops and Notopogon in this family too.

Species
Currently, two recognized species are placed in this genus:
 Macroramphosus gracilis (R. T. Lowe, 1839) (slender snipefish)
 Macroramphosus scolopax (Linnaeus, 1758) (longspine snipefish)

References

Centriscidae
Marine fish genera
Taxa named by Bernard Germain de Lacépède